Yeşiloba, also known as Medele, is a village in the district of Bekilli, Denizli Province, Turkey.

It is probably the site of ancient and medieval Motella.

External links
 Unofficial Website of Yeşiloba village
 Bekilli Municipality
 Prefecture of Bekilli

Villages in Bekilli District